Stygobromus hubbsi, commonly called Malheur Cave amphipod, is a troglomorphic species of amphipod in family Crangonyctidae. It is endemic to Oregon in the United States.

References

Freshwater crustaceans of North America
Cave crustaceans
Crustaceans described in 1942
hubbsi
Endemic fauna of Oregon